Catherine Murray, Countess of Dunmore (31 October 1814 – 12 February 1886), was an English peeress and promoter of Harris Tweed.

Family
Born Lady Catherine Herbert at Arlington Street, St James's, London, she was a daughter of George Herbert, 11th Earl of Pembroke and his second wife, the former Countess Catherine Vorontsov, daughter of Semyon Romanovich Vorontsov, the Russian Ambassador to the Court of St. James's.

On 27 May 1836, Lady Catherine married Alexander Murray, Viscount Fincastle at Frankfurt am Main. Fincastle acceded to his father's earldom of Dunmore a few months later. The couple had four children:

Lady Susan Catherine Mary (1837–1915), married 29 November 1860 James Carnegie, 9th Earl of Southesk as his second wife, and had issue three sons and four daughters.
Lady Constance Euphemia Woronzow (1838–1922), married William Buller-Fullerton-Elphinstone, 15th Lord Elphinstone.
Charles Adolphus, styled Viscount Fincastle, later 7th Earl of Dunmore (1841–1907)
Lady Victoria Alexandrina, or Lady Alexandrina Victoria Murray (1845–1911), married Rev. Henry Cunliffe (1826–1894), son of Sir Robert Henry Cunliffe, 4th Bt. CB, Gen., Bengal Army.

Later life
In 1841, Lady Dunmore was appointed a Lady of the Bedchamber to Queen Victoria but resigned upon her husband's death four years later. Following his death, she inherited  of the Dunmore estate on the "island" of Harris.

She made several improvements to the estate village, building a school and laying out a new village green.

Harris Tweed

During the economic difficulties of the Highland Potato Famine of 1846–47, Lady Dunmore paid for her tenants to emigrate and gave them a grant to help them settle. Together with "Fanny" Beckett she promoted Harris Tweed, a sustainable and local industry. Recognising the sales potential of the fabric, she had the Murray family tartan copied in tweed by the local weavers and suits were later made for the Dunmore estate. Proving a success, Lady Dunmore sought to widen the market by removing the irregularities, caused by dyeing, spinning and weaving (all done by hand), in the cloth to bring it in line with machine-made cloth. She achieved this by organising and financing training in Alloa for the Harris weavers and by the late 1840s, a London market was established, which led to an increase in sales of tweed.

"Fanny" Beckett moved to London in 1888 and the "Scottish Home Industries" which managed the new product, became a limited company in 1896.

Death
The Countess died, aged seventy-one, on 12 February 1886 at Carberry Tower, Inveresk, East Lothian, and was buried at Dunmore, Falkirk.

Arms

References

Sources
Christine Lodge, Murray , Catherine, countess of Dunmore (1814–1886), Oxford Dictionary of National Biography, accessed 26 Oct 2007

1814 births
1886 deaths
Scottish countesses
Daughters of British earls
English people of Russian descent
Ladies of the Bedchamber
Catherine
19th-century British women
19th-century British people
19th-century British philanthropists
Court of Queen Victoria